is a railway station located in Kamagaya, Chiba Prefecture, Japan, operated by the Shin-Keisei Electric Railway.The headquarters of Shin-Keisei Electric Railway as well as the rolling stock maintenance facility are also near the station.

Lines
Kunugiyama Station is served by the Shin-Keisei Line, and is located 9.6 kilometers from the terminus of the line at Matsudo Station.

Layout 
The station consists of a single island platform, with an elevated station building. The station is equipped with ticket vending machines and automatic ticket gates.

Platforms

History
Kunugiyama Station was opened on April 21, 1955.

Passenger statistics
In fiscal 2017, the station was used by an average of 3633 passengers daily.

Surrounding area
Shin-Keisei Electric Railway head office
JGSDF Camp Matsudo
Kamagaya Nishi High School

See also
 List of railway stations in Japan

References

External links

 Shin Keisei Railway Station information  

Railway stations in Japan opened in 1955
Railway stations in Chiba Prefecture
Kamagaya